Rolling Bay is a community on Bainbridge Island, located on the eastern side of the island. It consists of a number of stores (including Bay Hay & Feed, Rolling Bay Automotive, Rolling Bay Cafe, Rolling Bay Market, the Bud Hawk Post Office, Via Rosa 11) at the intersection of Sunrise Drive NE and NE Valley Road. Rolling Bay post office serves nearby the Sunrise area, North Madison, and the Manitou Beach area.  Most of Rolling Bay is not on the water. Among the waterfront areas near Rolling Bay is Manitou Beach, although referring to this area as Rolling Bay is common.

The Rolling Bay post office was renamed The Bud Hawk Post Office on February 26, 2010. Bud Hawk grew up in Rolling Bay who roaming its woods as a kid 80 years ago. He became a decorated World War II veteran, earning the Medal of Honor and four Purple Hearts while fighting in Europe as a U.S. Army machine-gunner. After the war, he was a longtime Kitsap County educator. The ZIP code 98061 only serves post office boxes at the Rolling Bay post office. The whole of Bainbridge Island uses the zip code 98110.

See also
Bud Hawk Post Office 

Photos of Bud hawk Post Office 

Rolling Bay Walk 

 List of Bainbridge Island communities

References

Communities of Bainbridge Island, Washington